The following individuals have started games at quarterback for the University of Notre Dame football team, updated through the 2022 season.

The year of induction into the College Football Hall of Fame, if applicable, is designated alongside the respective player's final season.

Win–loss records
Quarterbacks who have started for the Notre Dame football team from 1955 through the 2022 season. A player is credited with a win if he started the game and the team won that game, no matter if the player was injured or permanently removed on the second play from scrimmage.

Most starts
These quarterbacks have the 25 or more starts for Notre Dame since 1960.

Notes

References
 Bob Boyles & Paul Guido, 50 Years of College Football: A Modern History of America's Most Colorful Sport, (Skyhorse Publishing 2007) , pp 1070–1077.  
 ESPN College Football Encyclopedia: The Complete History of the Game, (ESPN Books 2005) , pp 640–641.
 Eric Hansen, Stadium Stories: Notre Dame Fighting Irish, (The Globe Pequot Press 2004) , pp 198–200.
 Steele, Michael R. The Fighting Irish Football Encyclopedia. Champaign, IL: Sports Publishing LLC (1996).
 UND.com, 

Notre Dame Fighting Irish

Notre Dame Fighting Irish
Notre Dame Fighting Irish quarterbacks